The Newmarket Royals were a junior ice hockey team in the Ontario Hockey League from 1992 to 1994. They played out of Newmarket, Ontario, Canada.

History
The Royals franchise started in 1969 as the Cornwall Royals of the Quebec Major Junior Hockey League. The Cornwall Royals won the Memorial Cup in 1972, 1980, and in 1981. For the 1981–82 season, the team transferred into the Ontario Hockey League.

In 1992 the Cornwall Royals moved to Newmarket, Ontario to play as the Newmarket Royals. This team should be not be confused with a different Newmarket Royals team in the OMHA in the early 1980s.

The first year for the Newmarket Royals was moderately successful, finishing 5th in the Leyden Division with a winning record. In the playoffs that year the Royals faced the Sudbury Wolves in a very heated 7 game series, won by the Wolves.

For every goal the Royals scored at home in the series that year (11 in total), a stuffed wolf was hung in the rafters. This was a move mocking the Sudbury Wolves stuffed wolf that howls at opposing bench whenever the home team Wolves score.

The second Royals season is best forgotten. The Newmarket Royals were the only team in OHL and CHL history to go winless in away games for an entire season. The Royals finished last in the OHL, 18 points behind the next closest team.

At the start of the 1993–94 season, the team was bought by the Ciccarelli brothers and a year later moved to Sarnia, Ontario to begin play as the Sarnia Sting.

Coaches
Both Shawn Mackenzie and Don Boyd, coaches of the Newmarket Royals were former goalies. Don Boyd previously coached the London Knights and the Sault Ste. Marie Greyhounds.

Shawn Mackenzie, a native of Bedford, Nova Scotia played in the OHL for the Windsor Spitfires and Oshawa Generals, and briefly for the New Jersey Devils in 1983. He later coached the Halifax Mooseheads in the QMJHL.

1992–1993 Shawn MacKenzie
1993–1994 Don Boyd

Players

The Newmarket Royals sent 9 players to compete in the NHL, all of whom were active for the 1992-1993 season. That year saw Jeff Reid total 106 points that year, Nathan Lafayette lead goal scorers with 49, and defenceman Mark DeSantis was voted a first team OHL All-Star.

NHL alumni

Season-by-season results

Regular season

Playoffs
1992–1993 Lost to Sudbury Wolves 4 games to 3 in first round.
1993–1994 Out of playoffs.

Uniforms and logos

The Royals redesigned their logo when the franchise shifted from Cornwall to Newmarket, but kept the same uniforms colours of royal blue, white and red. The new logo was a horizontal hockey stick with the words Newmarket Royals below it. Pictured are the home and away jerseys of # 8 Aaron Brand, that the team wore in their two seasons in the OHL.

Newmarket Recreational Complex
The Royals played home games at the Newmarket Recreational Complex. Since then the arena has been renamed the Ray Twinney Complex, for the former Mayor of Newmarket. It was built in 1985, and has a capacity of 3,700 seats.

External links
The OHL Arena & Travel Guide - Newmarket Recreational Complex

Defunct Ontario Hockey League teams
Sport in Newmarket, Ontario